The FF were a series of 20mm autocannon introduced by Oerlikon in the late 1920s. The name comes from the German term Flügel Fest, meaning wing mounted, fixed, being one of the first 20mm guns to be small and light enough to fit into a fighter aircraft's wing. The FF series inspired many 20mm cannon used in World War II, including the Hispano-Suiza HS.404 (adopted by the French, British and U.S. forces), the German MG FF, and the Japanese IJNAS's Type 99 cannon.

Design 
The basic design was based on the original Oerlikon 20 mm cannon, in turn based on the German Empire's Becker 20 mm cannon of World War I. In the post-war period, Oerlikon had developed the original design to produce three autocannons with increasingly powerful rounds; the original model, later known as the "F", used the Becker 20x70mm round, the newer "L" model used a 20x100 round, and finally the "S" model used a 20x110. All of these weapons used the API blowback operational principle.

In 1935 Oerlikon started development of versions suitable for use as wing-mounted guns. In addition to various changes needed for remote firing and cartidge ejection, the new series focused primarily on rate-of-fire. The gun weighed only . The original guns became known as the FF F from this point on.

The FF F was licensed by the Japanese and produced as the Type 99-1, along with the FF L as the Type 99-2. Hispano-Suiza built the FF S as the HS.7, and slightly improved HS.9. This design was later abandoned by Hispano-Suiza. In the 1930s, Marc Birkigt designed an entirely new gas-operated cannon with a locked bolt, the HS.404, which became one of the best 20 mm weapons of the war. Ikaria Werke in Germany started production of the FF F with a slightly more powerful 20x80mm round as the MG FF, but later introduced a new mine shell round which was lighter and improved velocity. The resulting MG FF/M was a common weapon until about 1944. Starting in late 1940 these were replaced by the very different Mauser MG 151/15 and Mauser MG 151/20 autocannon, respectively of 15mm (early) and 20mm calibre (primary production).

References

Bibliography 
Heller, Daniel. Zwischen Unternehmertum, Politik und Überleben. Emil G. Bührle und die Werkzeugmaschinenfabrik Oerlikon, Bührle & Co 1924–1945. Verlag Huber: Frauenfeld 2002.
 The Machine Gun, History, Evolution, and Development of Manual, Automatic, and Airborne Repeating Weapons. 1951 by George M. Chinn, Lieutenant Colonel USMC. Prepared for the Bureau of Ordnance Department of the Navy.

Oerlikon-Contraves
Aircraft guns
Autocannon
World War II weapons
20 mm artillery